When Darkness Falls (Swedish: När mörkret faller) is a 1960 Swedish thriller film directed by Arne Mattsson. The film is based on Maria Langs 1954 novel Tragedi på en lantkyrkogård. The film stars Nils Asther, Karl-Arne Holmsten, Birgitta Pettersson, Elsa Prawitz, Adolf Jahr, Mimi Nelson and George Fant. It was shot at the Centrumateljéerna Studios in Stockholm. The film's sets were designed by the art director Barbro Lindström. It was followed by a sequel Lovely Is the Summer Night in 1961.

Plot summary 
The young orphan girl Elisabeth from Stockholm is going to celebrate Christmas with relatives in Västlinge vicarage. When she arrives the day before Christmas the local shopkeeper is meant to pick her up at the station, but because of a misconception, Elisabeth is left to walk alone in the dark, in the deep snow all the way to the house. There she is warmly welcomed by the vicar Tord Ekstedt and his daughter Lotta, but the Christmas stillness ends abruptly when they on Christmas eve finds out that the shopkeeper has been found brutally murdered in his shop.

Cast
Nils Asther as Tord Ekstedt 
Karl-Arne Holmsten as Christer Wijk 
Birgitta Pettersson as Elisabeth Rydén 
Elsa Prawitz as Barbara Sandell
Adolf Jahr as Connie Lundgren
Mimi Nelson as Hjördis Holm
George Fant as Arne Sandell
Sif Ruud as Frideborg Jansson
Hjördis Petterson as Tekla Motander
Anna-Maria Giertz as Lotta Ekstedt
Bengt Brunskog as Mårten Gustavsson
Eva Sjöström as Susanne Motander, Tekla's daughter 
Sigge Fürst as docent Ahlgren, doctor 
Maritta Marke as Alice Broman, Connie Lundgren's sister
Sven-Erik Jacobsson as Carl Sixten

References

External links 

Swedish thriller films
1960s thriller films
1960s Swedish-language films
1960 films
Films based on Swedish novels
Films directed by Arne Mattsson
1960s Swedish films